Torrington is the most populated municipality and only city in Litchfield County, Connecticut and the Northwest Hills region. It is also the core city of Greater Torrington, one of the largest micropolitan areas in the United States. The city population was 35,515 according to the 2020 census.

Torrington is a former mill town, as are most other towns along the Naugatuck River Valley. Downtown Torrington is home to the Nutmeg Conservatory for the Arts, which trains ballet dancers and whose Company performs in the Warner Theatre, a 1,700-seat auditorium built in 1931 as a cinema by the Warner Brothers film studio. Downtown Torrington hosts the largest Lodge of Elks in New England. Elks Lodge #372 supports many community activities and events. Downtown Torrington also hosts KidsPlay, a children's museum which was founded in 2012 and expanded their location in 2015 after purchasing the adjacent building 

Torrington has two radio stations, WAPJ 89.9 FM, operated by the non-profit Torrington Community Radio Foundation, and WSNG 610 AM, owned by Buckley Broadcasting.

Torrington has two daily newspapers. The Republican-American, which circulates a Litchfield County edition and has a bureau on Franklin Street, and The Register Citizen, which serves Torrington and Winsted, in addition to most of the Northwest Corner. Charlotte Hungerford Hospital has also developed into an important health care resource for the area. In 2008, Torrington was named by Bizjournals as the number one "Dreamtown" (micropolitan statistical area) out of ten in the United States to live in.

History
Torrington was first settled in 1735 by Ebenezer Lyman, Jr., of Durham, Connecticut. The downtown section of Torrington was known as Wolcottville, after the Wolcott family of Connecticut, which produced several governors between 1813 and 1881. Its early settlers resided on the hills west of the Naugatuck River where the first school, church, store, and tavern were constructed. Later, the eastern hill known as Torringford was settled, as it provided the best farmland. Torrington was given permission to organize a government and incorporate as a town in October 1740. The town is named after Torrington in Devon, England.

The fast moving waters of the Naugatuck River were used to power early nineteenth-century industries.  Industrial growth skyrocketed when Frederick Wolcott constructed a woolen mill in 1813.  The mill attracted a large workforce and created demands for goods, services, and housing.

Israel Coe and Erastus Hodges began the construction of two brass mills on the Naugatuck River in 1834. This event sparked the beginning of the brass industry in Torrington, which later would spread throughout the entire Naugatuck Valley. In 1849, the Naugatuck Valley railroad was completed, connecting Torrington with other population centers, ending its isolation, and stimulating further industrial growth.  Soon, Torrington was producing a variety of metal products, including needles, brass, hardware, bicycles, and tacks.  Torrington's growing industrial plants attracted English, Irish, and German immigrants throughout the nineteenth and early twentieth centuries.  Between 1880 and 1920, Torrington's population soared from 3,000 to 22,000 as immigration from southern and eastern Europe increased; most immigrants during this period were Poles, Czechs, Slovaks, and Italians. Torrington was chartered as a city in 1923.

In 1955, a massive flood destroyed much of the downtown area and other property in the region when Hurricanes Connie and Diane caused local rivers to overflow. Torrington is home to several state parks, one of which is the very popular Burr Pond State Park. In 1851, Milo Burr placed a dam across the confluence of several mountain streams impounding water for power. The tannery and three active sawmills erected downstream consumed the finest pines and oaks for miles around to meet the needs of lumber production. The clearings became homesites, and Connecticut's industrial leadership was further strengthened. Burr Pond was designated as a state park in 1949. The pond itself has several small inlets and islands. The shore is rocky and there are deep drop-offs in several places, but the pond only has a maximum depth of thirteen feet. Fish species present include largemouth bass, chain pickerel, black crappie, yellow perch, bluegill, pumpkinseed, and brown bullhead.
Gail Borden, discoverer of the process of milk preservation by evaporation and condensation, built the world's first condensed milk factory here, in 1856. The new milk product proved to be of great value, particularly to the Union Army during the Civil War. Fire destroyed the mill in 1877. A bronze tablet marks its site, just below the falls.

Torrington is the birthplace of abolitionist John Brown. The birthplace accidentally burned in 1918.
In the year 2000, the Torrington Historical Society acquired  the property in merger with the John Brown Association. Plans are now being  formulated to improve visitor services and to construct interpretive trails on the property.
Torrington Historical Society.

There was a 100-acre University of Connecticut regional campus in Torrington. It closed in May 2016 due to low enrollment  In 2018 the site was sold to Five Points Arts Gallery for $375,000.

Downtown redevelopment
Torrington is planning to revitalize its downtown area in an effort to attract residents and visitors to the city's shopping and cultural opportunities. These redevelopment plans are still in discussion and are not yet completed. The City of Torrington will receive $500,000 for improvements and streetscape enhancements to Torrington's Main Street and downtown. The grant, which will flow through the state, will be designated for downtown improvements on the east side of Main Street and will include, among other enhancements, new sidewalks. A $750,000 grant for downtown improvements secured earlier in 2012 for the west side of Main Street will make similar improvements.

The following ideas have been discussed:

Coe Memorial Park restoration
The historic restoration and renovation to downtown Coe Memorial Park were completed in the beginning of 2004. The Coe Memorial Park Subcommittee and the City of Torrington, worked closely with Ferrero Hixon Associates, to restore the Park to a Victorian walking park, much as it was when it was first gifted to the Town in 1906. These renovations included new sidewalks and paths, and the relocation of memorials and monuments. In 2005, award-winning horticulturist, Gwenythe B. Harvey, owner of the firm The Garden Goddess, LLC, was hired to redefine, design and upgrade existing garden areas. Coe Memorial Park's Botanical Gardens has since become a well-known tourist destination.

Retail expansion
Torrington hopes to attract a wide variety of merchants into its downtown setting. Empty and abandoned buildings would be converted into a mix of retail, office, and residential space. A potential plan discusses the possibility of a national clothing retailer or bookstore chain constructing a location at the top of Water Street on the site of the Kelley Bus Company. This plan had come under fire by some because it involves the demolition of the former Torrington railroad station, which is considered by many to be historical. Despite this, the 113-year-old former Torrington railroad station was demolished, as a safety hazard, on January 4, 2011. The historical society was able to save a few pieces, including the ticket window and some of the terra-cotta ornaments from the outside of the building. A Big Y supermarket and a Lowe's Home Improvement store opened in the summer of 2009 on Winsted Road.

Accessibility
A parking garage is slated to be constructed in the heart of downtown on either Main Street or Water Street. The municipal parking lot next to the Torrington Library would also serve as a downtown parking area. Because the downtown redevelopment project emphasizes pedestrian access, brick sidewalks lined with trees, benches, and bike racks would be constructed along Main Street.

Roads and traffic
To relieve congestion, the city plans to convert the Main Street/Water Street/East Main Street downtown intersection into a "+" shape, rather than its current criticized setup. The city expects to convert Main Street into a one-way road with parking lining one side of the street. The neighboring Prospect Street would also be converted into a one-way road with traffic flowing in the opposite direction. Most of the roads are in medium to poor condition and filled with pot holes.

Geography
According to the United States Census Bureau, the city has a total area of 40.4 square miles (104.6 km). Approximately 39.8 square miles (103.1 km) of it is land and 1.5 km (0.6 sq mi or 1.41%) of it is water.

The eastern and western sides of the city, at its borders, are at the tops of peaks, while the downtown and central sections of the city are in the Naugatuck River Valley. This provides some interesting views from the higher locations, with the city lights as a backdrop below. Due to the lack of suitable highways and bypass routes in an East–west direction, crossing the city requires driving down into the valley and back up the other side.

Principal communities
Burrville
Drakeville
Newfield
Torringford (part of which has been named the Torringford Street Historic District)
Downtown Torrington
West Torrington
Wrightville

Climate
This climatic region is typified by large seasonal temperature differences, with warm to hot (and often humid) summers and cold (sometimes severely cold) winters.  According to the Köppen Climate Classification system, Torrington has a humid continental climate, abbreviated "Dfb" on climate maps.

Demographics

As of the census of 2000, there were 35,202 people, 14,743 households, and 9,125 families residing in the city. The racial makeup of the city was 93.03% White, 2.15% Black or African American, 0.20% Native American, 1.83% Asian, 0.02% Pacific Islander, 1.31% from other races, and 1.47% from two or more races. Hispanic or Latino of any race were 3.30% of the population.

There were 14,743 households, out of which 28.5% had children under the age of 18 living with them, 47.7% were married couples living together, 10.3% had a female householder with no husband present, and 38.1% were non-families. 32.1% of all households were made up of individuals, and 13.7% had someone living alone who was 65 years of age or older.  The average household size was 2.33 and the average family size was 2.96.

In the city, the population was spread out, with 23.0% under the age of 18, 6.4% from 18 to 24, 31.0% from 25 to 44, 22.0% from 45 to 64, and 17.6% who were 65 years of age or older.  The median age was 39 years. For every 100 females, there were 93.9 males.  For every 100 females age 18 and over, there were 89.0 males.

The median income for a household in the city was $41,841, and the median income for a family was $54,375. Males had a median income of $37,702 versus $28,418 for females. The per capita income for the city was $21,406.

Infrastructure

Main Street Marketplace
Main Street Marketplace (MSMP) was created in 2009 by founders Steve Criss, Rose Ponte, Jessica Hodorski and the 2009 ACT Commissioners.  The original idea for MSMP was to create an event to bring families together downtown to support the local merchants.  Since 2009,  MSMP brings in about 3,000 visitors a night, has 40–45 exhibitors, 15–20 food vendors, non-profit exhibitors, and a variety of different types of performers every night.
It is a multi-week event  that runs consecutively during the summer on a specified weeknight from 5 to 9 o'clock. Main Street is shut down and the marketplace extends from Water Street to Alvord Street.

Transportation
Three primary state highways meet in downtown Torrington: Route 8, Route 4, and Route 202. Other major roads include Route 183 and Route 272. The city is served by buses of the Northwestern Connecticut Transit District. Northeast Transportation Company operates connecting service to Waterbury. 

There is freight rail service operated by the Naugatuck Railroad extending up the Waterbury Branch to Torrington.

Bradley International Airport (BDL) in Windsor Locks is the closest major commercial airport to Torrington.

City financial report (2004) 
The City of Torrington typically collects 100% of taxes owed through the use of private tax collectors.

The 2004 General Fund budgetary fund balance was $5.8 million. The city has bonded debt outstanding of $36.8 million for governmental activities and $4.2 million for business type (WPCA). All current outstanding bonded debt will be retired by the year 2021 (current estimate).

Torrington's bond rating is A1.

In 2004, total revenue was $88,444,157: Property Taxes (64.40%), Board of Education Grants (23.44%), Federal & State Grants (7.06%), General Government (3.67%), Public Safety (0.64%), Public Works (0.53%), Invest Income (0.26%), and Recreation (0.01%).

Total expenditures and encumbrances were $88,679,873: Board of Education (53.41%), Public Safety (12.97%), Pension & Miscellaneous (10.58%), Public Works (8.34%), Debt Services (7.69%), General Government (3.49%), Public Health & Social Services (1.99%), Operating Transfers Out (0.85%), Recreation (0.40%), Second Part Budget (0.29%).

Crime and law enforcement
The number of violent crimes recorded by the FBI in 2003 was 139. The number of homicides was 0. The violent crime rate was 3.9 per 1,000 people.

In 1984–1985 Torrington's Police Department was sued by Tracey Thurman, who was nearly killed in 1983 by her estranged husband Charles "Buck" Thurman. In Thurman v. City of Torrington (finalized 1985), the federal court levied a $2.3 million judgment against the city for refusing to enforce its previous restraining orders because the perpetrator was married to the victim. Thurman's abuse, attempted murder and lawsuit were later depicted in a 1989 made-for-TV movie A Cry for Help: The Tracey Thurman Story, starring Nancy McKeon.

In March 2013, Torrington received a degree of national notoriety for a statutory rape case involving three teen-aged boys accused of sexually assaulting two 13-year-old girls. Joan Toribio and Edgar Gonzalez, both 18, were among the accused. Both were popular high school football players, who claimed that the encounters were consensual. The third male, Dylan Rodriguez, was underage himself. Several dozen Torrington High School students rallied around the accused and allegedly aggressively bullied the victims online. One of the victims was called a “hoe” on her Facebook page and blamed for "ruining the lives" of the accused.  Despite receiving national criticism, Torrington High School students continued to use social media to support the defendants, posting online photos while diminishing the validity and severity of the victim's claims.

Sports teams/events

Baseball 
A professional baseball team and two collegiate baseball teams have played their home games at Fuessenich Park.

The Torrington Titans played in the Futures Collegiate Baseball League of New England. They played their inaugural season in the Atlantic Collegiate Baseball League, a collegiate summer baseball league. After leading the ACBL in attendance in 2010, the team was sold to the Carminucci Sports Group (CSG), which transferred their affiliation to the Futures League. CSG owns both the Brockton Rox of the professional Can-Am League, and fellow Futures League affiliate the Martha's Vineyard Sharks.

In 2009, an organization called Our Baseball Haven, introduced a unique concept and proposal through which a collegiate baseball team could once again call Torrington its home. The concept, called "crowdsourcing" was supported by some five hundred individuals and the Peekskill (NY) Robins of the Atlantic Collegiate Baseball League (ACBL) were moved to Torrington and their name changed to the Torrington Titans. The Titans capped their successful 2010 inaugural season by winning the Kaiser Division. The Titans did not return for the 2017 season 

The Torrington Twisters were a member of the New England Collegiate Baseball League (NECBL) from 1997 to 2008. Torrington twice played host to the league All-Star Game (1998, 2008) and generally placed high in their division each season. The organization made an abrupt move to Massachusetts after 2008.

A professional baseball team once located in the city was known as the Torrington Braves, and were a member of the Colonial League. After just one season, 1950, they disbanded.

Running 

The Torrington Road Race is a five-mile (8 km) run, which coincides with Donor's Week in August. Starting at Coe Memorial Park, the course extends to the farther reaches of the valley, including Riverside Avenue, Migeon Avenue, Prospect Street and others. The race, which started in 1972, primarily includes runners from around Connecticut and has also attracted some runners each year from Massachusetts, New York, New Jersey, Pennsylvania, and others. The record time for the race was 24:22 by Evance Rotich in 2008. Chris Chisholm holds the record for number of times winning the race with six (1984, 2002–2003, 2013–2015), and Anne Curi-Preisig holds the record for most first-place woman finishes with six (1990–1991, 1993–1996). Rosa Moriello is the only woman to finish as the overall winner of the race, with a time of 27:55 in 2012.

High school sports 
Torrington High School typically offers football, soccer, volleyball, cross country, swimming, basketball, track, baseball, softball, tennis, and golf, as well as cheerleading and dance.

The Torrington High School Athletic Hall of Fame has elected more than 100 individuals since 1998.

In 2006, the Torrington High School Men's Basketball team captured their first Connecticut State Championship since 1944, beating rival high school Holy Cross of Waterbury.

On the National Register of Historic Places
 Downtown Torrington Historic District—Roughly bounded by Church and Alvord Sts., Center Cemetery, Willow St., E. Main St., Litchfield St., and Prospect St. (added 1988)
 Fyler-Hotchkiss Estate—192 Main St. (added 1987)
 James Alldis House—355 Prospect St. (added 1982)

 Migeon Avenue Historic District—Roughly along Migeon Ave. and parts of Forest St. (added 2002)
 Paugnut Forest Administration Building—385 Burr Mountain Rd. (added 1986)
 Skee's Diner—589 Main St. (added 2002)
 South School—362 S. Main St. (added 1986)
 Torringford Street Historic District—Torringford St. from East Main St. to W. Hill Rd. (added 1991)
 Torrington Fire Department Headquarters—117 Water St. (added 1987)
 Villa Friuli—58 High St. (added 1991)
 Warner Theatre—68-82 Main St. (added 1984)
 Warrenton Woolen Mill—839 Main St. (added 1987)
 Water Street Historic District—Roughly along Water St., from Church St. to Prospect St. (added 2003)

Notable people

 James Ashborn (1816–1876), came to Torrington from England as a young adult, was the first to file a patent for the capo
 John Brown (1800–1859), abolitionist, was born in Torrington
 Josiah Bunting III (born 1939), author, educator, soldier and Superintendent of the Virginia Military Institute
 W. G. Curtis (1857–1913), a homesteader and politician, lived in Torrington, Connecticut, and later founded and named the town of Torrington, Wyoming after his former residence
 Dick Ebersol (born 1947), chairman of NBC Universal Sports, was born in Torrington
 Frank Fixaris (1934–2006), Maine sportscaster, was born in Torrington and grew up at 600 Prospect St.
 Aline Huke Frink (1904–2000), mathematician, professor at Pennsylvania State University, born in Torrington
 Matt Gorman (born 1989), Republican political strategist and television analyst, was born in Torrington. 
 Ellen Maria Huntington Gates  (1835–1920), hymn writer and poet
 Horace Holley (1887–1960), prominent follower of the Bahai Faith was born in Torrington
 Samuel John Mills (1783–1818), Congregationalist missionary
 Lyman Cornelius Smith (1850–1910), an industrialist and founder of the L.C. Smith & Brothers Typewriter Company, which grew into the Smith-Corona Company, was born here
 William L. Shirer, Author of “The Rise and Fall of the Third Reich”, lived on the 40 acre estate on Stillwater Pond Road (formerly, Brass Mill Damn Rd.); once the location of Torrington’s first dairy farm. 
 Steven Strogatz, American mathematician and popularizer of mathematics, born in Torrington
 Karl Swenson (1908–1978), actor, who died in Torrington
 Tracey Thurman, a victim of domestic violence that drew national attention in 1985
 Patricia Wald (1928–2019), first female judge of the Washington, D.C., circuit, was born and raised in Torrington
 Jordan Williams (born 1990), basketball center for the Maryland Terrapins and the New Jersey Nets
 Jocko Willink (born 1971), US Navy SEAL Lt. Commander, Author, Podcaster. Born in Torrington
 Bill C. Davis (1961–2021), playwright, was living in Torrington at the time of his death

References

External links

 Torrington City Government Website
 Northwest Connecticut Chamber of Commerce
 Torrington Elks Lodge #372
 Northwest Connecticut Arts Council
 Northwest Connecticut Convention and Visitors Bureau
 Coe Memorial Park website
 Torrington Public School System
 Catholic School System
 Oliver Wolcott Technical High School
 Northwestern Connecticut Community College in adjacent Winsted
 Torringford Volunteer Fire Department website 
 Torrington Firefighter's Union website

 
Cities in Connecticut
Cities in Litchfield County, Connecticut
Cities in the New York metropolitan area